According to the Table of Nations in the Book of Genesis in the Hebrew Bible, Gether ( Geṯer) was the third son of Aram, son of Shem. He appears only twice in the Hebrew Bible, and both times is only mentioned in passing in genealogical lists. In the Table of Nations (Genesis 10:23), he is identified as a son of Aram, while in 1 Chronicles 1:17, he is listed among the sons of Shem.

In Islamic traditions, he (here called 'Athir') is sometimes considered the father of Thamud, whose descendant was the Islamic prophet Salih.

According to the first-century Jewish historian Josephus, Gether is an ancestor of the Bactrians. Jerome (c. 390) considers Gether the ancestor of the Acarnanians. Isidore of Seville (c. 635) makes him ancestor of the Acarnanians or Curians.

Australian Chinese revolutionary Tse Tsan-Tai makes him the ancestor of the Polynesians.

References

Book of Genesis people
Books of Chronicles people
Noach (parashah)